Hinton Waldrist Castle was in Hinton Waldrist about  north of Wantage. Hinton Waldrist spent most of its history in Berkshire until in 1974 it was transferred to Oxfordshire.

The castle was originally a motte and bailey with a moat.  The first castle was built of timber by the St. Valery family after the Norman conquest of England. In the Middle Ages the castle was rebuilt in stone when it belonged to the Bohuns, the Earls of Hereford. Mary de Bohun was brought up here and married Henry of Bolingbroke who became King Henry IV. Their son, Henry V, visited the castle often in his younger days.

Only earthworks are visible today.

References

Sources
David Nash Ford's Royal Berkshire History: Hinton Castle, Childhood Home of the King's Mother

Castles in Berkshire